The Ukrainian Cup 2004–05 was the 14th annual edition of Ukraine's football knockout competition, known as the Ukrainian Cup. The first game was conducted on August 4, 2004 with the game between Rava and Shakhtar Donetsk in Rava-Ruska, Lviv Region. However other sources with a reference to the Professional Football League of Ukraine state that the competition started on August 6, 2004 with game between Olkom and Dynamo Kyiv in Melitopol, Zaporizhzhia Oblast. Traditionally the final took place in late May of the next year where the same Shakhtar yielded to Dynamo Kyiv at the Olympic Stadium 0:1.

It was the last season of the format that did not involve any qualification and preliminary rounds. Every club started from the Round of 64 (1/32 of final) regardless of their position in the league's system structure. However the lower division clubs were given a home-field advantage.

Round and draw dates
All draws held at FFU headquarters (Building of Football) in Kyiv unless stated otherwise.

Competition Schedule

First round 
The First Round took place in the first half of August 2004. Officially games took place on August 7 unless otherwise indicated.

Second round 
The Second Round took place on August 19 through August 22, 2004 with most games taken place on August 22. Unless otherwise indicated games presumed to take place on August 22.

Third Round (1/8) 
The third round matches consisted of eight match-ups out of which four took place on September 11, while the other four – on September 12, 2004.

Quarterfinals 
The first leg was scheduled to take place on October 16, while the second leg – on November 20, 2004.

|}

Semifinals 
The semifinals took place on April 21 and May 4, 2005. 

|}

Final

References

External links
 Game reports for 2004–05 season

Ukrainian Cup seasons
Cup
Ukrainian Cup